The Ronuro River is a river of Mato Grosso state in western Brazil, a tributary of the Xingu River.

The river drains the  Rio Ronuro Ecological Station, a strictly protected conservation unit created in 1998. It also flows through the Xingu Indigenous Park.

See also
List of rivers of Mato Grosso

References

External links
Brazilian Ministry of Transport

Rivers of Mato Grosso